Cape Sata (佐多岬, Sata Misaki) is a cape at the southern tip of the Ōsumi Peninsula of Kyūshū island, Japan, and is the southernmost point of the island, just south of 31 degrees latitude.

Cape Sata is home to a lighthouse built in 1871, designed by the Scotsman Richard Henry Brunton.

Prior to 2013, the land was under the jurisdiction of a private company, and cost 300 yen to enter with open hours between 9 a.m. and 5 p.m.

However, Sata is now free to enter, and its abandoned restaurant and observation deck have since been torn down.

Alan Booth's 1986 book The Roads to Sata details his walk from Cape Sōya at the northern tip of Hokkaidō south to Cape Sata.

Gallery

See also 

 Extreme points of Japan

Sata
Landforms of Kagoshima Prefecture
Extreme points of Japan
Tourist attractions in Kagoshima Prefecture